Madarganj is an Upazila in Jamalpur District, in the Division of Mymensingh, Bangladesh.The area is known for its rich cultural heritage, natural beauty, and agricultural productivity.

Geography and Climate

Madarganj is located at 24.90°N 89.90°E, with an area of 202.09 square kilometers. The area is surrounded by the Jamuna River, which gives it a unique geographic advantage. The climate of Madarganj is tropical, with temperatures ranging from 20°C to 32°C. The area receives an average rainfall of 2,341 mm annually. It is bordered by Bakshiganj upazila to the north, Dewanganj upazila to the east, Islampur upazila to the south, and Sarishabari upazila to the west.

Administration
Jamalpur Sadar Thana was formed in 1853 and it was turned into an upazila 1983. Municipality was established in 1869.

Madarganj Upazila is divided into Madarganj Municipality and seven union parishads: Adarvita, Balijuri, Char Pakerdah, Gunaritala, Jorekhali, Karaichara, and Sidhuli. The union parishads are subdivided into 101 mauzas and 119 villages.

Every five years, the Upazila and Union Parisad elect representatives (commissionaire) and chairman for Municipality and 7 union Councils.

Agriculture
Madarganj is known for its agricultural productivity. The fertile soil and favorable climate make it an ideal place for cultivating various crops. The main crops grown in Madarganj are rice, jute, wheat, sugarcane, and vegetables. According to a report by the Bangladesh Bureau of Statistics, Madarganj produced 45,530 tons of rice in 2020-21, making it one of the top rice-producing areas in the country.

Education

Education is a top priority in Madarganj. The area has numerous educational institutions that provide quality education to the local students. According to a report by the Bangladesh Education Board, Madarganj has a literacy rate of 62.77%. The government has established primary schools, high schools, and colleges in the area to ensure that every child receives a quality education.The upazila is also home to one college, the Madarganj Degree College, which offers undergraduate courses in arts, science, and commerce.

Culture and Tourism
Madarganj has a rich cultural heritage. The area is famous for its traditional folk music, dance, and art. The local people celebrate various festivals throughout the year, such as Eid-ul-Fitr, Eid-ul-Adha, and Durga Puja. Tourists can also enjoy the natural beauty of Madarganj, including the Jamuna River and its surroundings. There are also several historical sites in the area, such as the Teyara Mosque and the Kherua Bridge, which attract tourists from all over the country.

Transportation
Madarganj is well-connected to other parts of the country through various modes of transportation. The area has a railway station that connects it to major cities such as Dhaka and Chittagong. The roads in Madarganj are well-maintained, and buses and private cars regularly ply on them. The government has also initiated a project to construct a bridge over the Jamuna River, which will further improve the transportation system of the area.

Healthcare
The government has established several healthcare facilities in Madarganj to ensure that the local people receive quality healthcare services. The Upazila Health Complex is the main healthcare facility in the area, which provides medical services to the local population. The government has also initiated several health awareness programs to educate the local people about various health issues.

See also
Upazilas of Bangladesh
Districts of Bangladesh
Divisions of Bangladesh

References
1. Bangladesh Bureau of Statistics. (2021). District Statistics 2020. Retrieved from https://bps.gov.bd/content/district-statistics-2020-0

2. Bangladesh Education Board. (2022). District Education Information 2022. Retrieved from https://www.educationboard.gov.bd/

3. Bangladesh Tourism Board. (2022). Madarganj Tourist Information. Retrieved from https://www.tourismboard.gov.bd/madarganj-tourist-information/

4. Ministry of Health and Family Welfare. (2022). Upazila Health Complexes. Retrieved from http://www.mohfw.gov.bd/index.php?option=com_content&view=article&id=577&Itemid=689

5. The Daily Star. (2022). Work on Jamuna Bridge connecting Tangail-Jamalpur to start in July. Retrieved from https://www.thedailystar.net/business/news/work-jamuna-bridge-connecting-tangail-jamalpur-start-july-3108473

6. Bangladesh Railway. (2022). Train Schedule. Retrieved from https://www.railway.gov.bd/site/page/4c3bc551-1a63-4c61-8b67-861eb225bd07

7. Bangladesh Journals Online. (2018). Agricultural production and productivity in Bangladesh: trends and determinants. Retrieved from https://www.banglajol.info/index.php/JAAR/article/view/39950

8. Culture Trip. (2022). Discovering the Traditional Folk Music of Bangladesh. Retrieved from https://theculturetrip.com/asia/bangladesh/articles/discovering-the-traditional-folk-music-of-bangladesh/

9. Lonely Planet. (2022). Bangladesh. Retrieved from https://www.lonelyplanet.com/bangladesh/madarganj

10. Jamalpur District Administration. (2022). About Madarganj. Retrieved from http://jamalpur.gov.bd/site/page/137d1c27-075b-11e7-a6c5-286ed488c766/about-madarganj

Upazilas of Jamalpur District